"Improving the Neighbourhood" is a science fiction short story by English writer Arthur C. Clarke. It was first published in Nature on 4 November 1999 and was the first piece of science fiction Nature ever published. It is also the last story included in The Collected Stories of Arthur C. Clarke, where it is dedicated to Dr. Pons and Dr. Fleischmann.

Plot summary
The story is written as a monologue and tells of the development of a civilization and a disaster which destroys them when they are on the verge of abandoning their "clumsy chemically fuelled bodies and thus achieve multiple connectivity."

References

External links 
 
 

1999 short stories
Short stories by Arthur C. Clarke
Works originally published in Nature (journal)